Crenotrichaceae is a family of environmental bacteria.

References

Sphingobacteriia